Tutak-e Sofla (also Romanized as Tūtak-e Soflá; also known as Tootak, Tūtak, Tūtak-e Pā’īn, Tūtak-Pā’īn, and Tūtang-e Pā’īn) is a village in Hoseynabad-e Goruh Rural District, Rayen District, Kerman County, Kerman Province, Iran. At the 2006 census, its population was 32, in 7 families.

References 

Populated places in Kerman County